Gapyeong County is a county in Gyeonggi Province, South Korea.  It was the scene of the Battle of Kapyong, a major battle of the Korean War.

Administrative Region and Language 
Gapyeong County has one eup and five myeon, and its population is 62,448 with 29,212 households based on resident registration at the end of December 2016, with an area of 843.6 km2. About 31.6 percent of the population lives in Gapyeong-eup, while 23.1 percent live in Cheongpyeong-myeon.

Tourism
Gapyeong is known for its natural environment, and borders the mountainous province of Gangwon on the east.  The north branch of the Han River flows through the area.  Several reservoirs and resorts are located in the county. The Namiseom resort island, while not strictly located in the county, is situated very close south of Gapyeong.

Gapyeong is also known for being the home to a number of Korea's makgeolli producers and it is where an annual National Makgeolli Festival has been held since 2011.

Education
Cheongshim Graduate School of Theology is a school run by the Unification Church. It is located at Seorak-myeon, and was dedicated on January 28, 2004. The school serves as a post-graduate institution teaching Unification theology.

Cheongshim International Academy is located in the county as well.

Climate
Gapyeong has a monsoon-influenced humid continental climate (Köppen: Dwa) with cold, dry winters and hot, rainy summers.

Sister cities
 Kota Kinabalu, Malaysia
 Gangnam-gu, South Korea
 Cedar City, Utah, United States

See also
 Cheongpyeong
 Cheongpyeong Lake
 Geography of South Korea
 Gapyeong Canada Monument

References

External links
 County government website

 
Counties of Gyeonggi Province